
Taboo is a pornographic movie series of the 1980s and 1990s, which eroticizes father-daughter & mother-son incest. It stars Kay Parker among others, and was directed by Kirdy Stevens among others.

Taboo (1980)
Taboo 2 (1982) 
Taboo 3 - The Final Chapter (1984)
Taboo 4 - The Younger Generation (1985)
Taboo 5 - The Secret (1987)
Taboo 6 - The Obsession (1988)
Taboo 7 - The Wild And The Innocent (1989)
Taboo 8 - The Magic Is Back (1990)
Taboo 9 (1991)
Taboo 10 - Ten Years Later (1993) 
Taboo 11 - Crazy On You (1994)
Taboo 12 (1994)

Taboo 13  (1994)
Taboo 14 - Kissing Cousins (1995)
Taboo 15 (1995)
Taboo 16 - But Not Sweet (1996)
Taboo 17 (1997)
Taboo 18 - Her Secret Life (1998)
Taboo 19 (1998)
Taboo 2001 - Sex Odyssey (2002)
Taboo 21 - Taboo 212 (2004)
Taboo 22 (2006)
Taboo 23 (2007)

Awards

Memoirs
 Kay Parker: Taboo: Sacred, Don't Touch (a book where she talks about her past career in adult movies and her experiences with the Metaphysical)

References

External links
 
 
 
 

Pornographic film series
Incest pornography
MILF pornography
Incest in film
AVN Award winners